The Talent Series is a series of novels written for preteenagers and teenagers by Zoey Dean. It is one of Zoey Dean's many preteen series.

Books 

The books are published by Razorbill. The complete series has been published in paperback.

 Talent
 Almost Famous
 Star Power
 Young Hollywood (cancelled)

References 

Novel series
Fictional talent agents
Razorbill books